Lauren Frances Winner (born 1976) is an American historian, scholar of religion, and Episcopal priest. She is Associate Professor of Christian Spirituality at Duke Divinity School. Winner writes and lectures on Christian practice, the history of Christianity in America, and Jewish–Christian relations.

Winner was born to a Jewish father and a Southern Baptist mother, and was raised Jewish. She converted to Orthodox Judaism in her freshman year at Columbia University, and then to Christianity while doing her master's degree at Cambridge University, and one of her most popular books, Mudhouse Sabbath, is about becoming a Christian while appreciating the Jewishness of historical Christian faith. She completed her doctoral work at Columbia University in 2006. Winner's fourth book, A Cheerful and Comfortable Faith: Anglican Religious Practice in the Elite Households of Colonial Virginia is based on her dissertation.

Winner has worked as a book editor of Beliefnet and senior editor of Christianity Today. In 2000 she wrote a column asserting that few young evangelicals took a commitment to premarital chastity seriously, using the phrase "evangelical whores". Julia Duin suggests that Winner was a "fairly recent convert" at the time, and "the evangelical response to Winner was livid." Duin goes on to relate that "Christianity Today quickly demoted her to a staff writer spot when people started asking why such a recent convert in her early twenties and still in grad school had managed to attain senior writer status at such a revered publication."

Since 2000, Winner's writing and theology has continued to evolve. She completed a Master of Divinity degree at Duke University in 2007. She has served as a visiting fellow at the Center for the Study of Religion at Princeton University and the Institute of Sacred Music at Yale University and volunteers regularly at the Raleigh Correctional Center for Women.

Her memoir, Girl Meets God has been described as "a passionate and thoroughly engaging account of a continuing spiritual journey within two profoundly different faiths." A second memoir, Still: Notes on a Mid-faith Crisis, released on January 31, 2012, chronicles her thoughts on God as she descends into doubt and spiritual crisis following the failure of her brief (2003–2009) marriage. Christianity Today calls Still "an instant spiritual classic." Her other books include Mudhouse Sabbath; Real Sex: The Naked Truth about Chastity; and Wearing God: Clothing, Laughter, Fire, and Other Overlooked Ways of Meeting God (2016).

Winner was ordained to the priesthood in the Episcopal Diocese of Virginia on December 17, 2011.

References

Living people
Jewish American writers
American women journalists
Converts to Anglicanism from Judaism
Duke Divinity School faculty
Columbia College (New York) alumni
American Episcopal theologians
Alumni of Clare College, Cambridge
American Episcopal priests
1976 births
Duke University alumni
Women religious writers
Women Anglican clergy
20th-century American non-fiction writers
20th-century American women writers
21st-century American non-fiction writers
21st-century American women writers
American women academics
21st-century American Jews